Sanjay Jain (born May 17, 1962) is an Indian senior advocate. He has served as Additional Solicitor General of India for the Supreme Court of India since January 15, 2019. In 1985, he became an advocate and in 2005 he was designated as a senior advocate by the Delhi High Court. From 2014 to 2018, he was an Additional Solicitor General of India for the Delhi High Court.

Career
He advised and appeared for Central Government and Public Sector Undertakings in matters involving the interpretation of Constitution; corporate and commercial laws, banning of terrorist and disruptive organizations, extradition, CBI and NIA prosecutions, electricity laws, competition laws, petroleum and natural gas, money laundering and benami prohibition laws, constitutional aspects of direct and indirect taxes, international arbitration, and public international laws.
 
He appeared before the National Human Rights Commission in matters relating to Kashmiri migrants, the use of asbestos in water pipes, and the working conditions in a diamond processing factory at Vizag. He was also involved in the matter of coal substitution as a source of energy in the vicinity of Kaziranga National Park, Assam.
 
He rendered opinions and advice to various government departments such as the Ministry of Health in respect of the CGHS contracts with private hospitals; the Ministry of Tourism and Culture in honour of formulation of guidelines to grant licences to tourist guides and grant of licenses to photographers at Taj Mahal and Fatehpur Sikri; the Director-General of the Archaeological Survey of India regarding the Taj corridor case, amendments in the Antiquities and Art Treasures Act, 1972, and in respect of monuments protected under the Ancient Monuments and Archaeological Sites and Remains Act, 1958. 
 
He represented the Indian Government in the Special Tribunals to ban outlawed organisations like ULFA in Northeast India.

References

1962 births
Living people